The New Zealand women's national rugby union team have officially competed since 1991, this is a list of individual records achieved since then. The team is also known as the Black Ferns, and have competed in Test rugby since their first officially recognised match against Canada at the 1991 Women's Rugby World Cup in Wales. The Black Ferns record for Test appearances is held by Kendra Cocksedge, who played 68 Test matches for the team between 2007 and 2022. She also holds the record for most Test points with 388. The record for the number of Test tries is held by Vanessa Cootes, who scored 43 tries in 16 matches between 1995 and 2002.

Most caps 

Current as of England vs New Zealand, 19 November 2022. Statistics include officially capped matches only. Current Black Ferns are indicated in bold type.

Most tries 

Current as of England vs New Zealand, 19 November 2022. Statistics include officially capped matches only. Current Black Ferns are indicated in bold type.

Most points 

Current as of England vs New Zealand, 12 November 2022. Statistics include officially capped matches only. Current Black Ferns are indicated in bold type.

Most points in a match 

Current as of England vs New Zealand, 12 November 2022. Statistics include officially capped matches only. Current Black Ferns are indicated in bold type.

Most tries in a match 

Current as of England vs New Zealand, 12 November 2022. Statistics include officially capped matches only. Current Black Ferns are indicated in bold type.

Most matches as captain 

Current as of England vs New Zealand, 12 November 2022. Statistics include officially capped matches only. Current Black Ferns are indicated in bold type.

Youngest players 

Current as of England vs New Zealand, 12 November 2022. Statistics include officially capped matches only. Current Black Ferns are indicated in bold type.

Oldest players 

Current as of England vs New Zealand, 12 November 2022. Statistics include officially capped matches only. Current Black Ferns are indicated in bold type.

External links
 Black Ferns Player Records at stats.allblacks.com

Rugby union records and statistics
New Zealand women's national rugby union team